Pierella lena, the Lena pierella, is a species of butterfly of the family Nymphalidae. It is found in Suriname, the Guianas, Peru, Bolivia and Brazil.

Subspecies
Pierella lena lena 
Pierella lena brasiliensis C.Felder & R.Felder, 1862 (Peru, Bolivia, Brazil: Amazonas)

References

Butterflies described in 1767
Haeterini
Nymphalidae of South America
Taxa named by Carl Linnaeus